The term Pyrenean refers to things of or from the Pyrenees mountain range dividing France and Spain, being Andorra in the middle. It may also refer to:

 Pyrenean Shepherd, a medium-small breed of dog native to the Pyrenees mountains in southern France and northern Spain
 Pyrenean Mountain Dog or Great Pyrenees, a large breed of dog used as a livestock guardian dog
 Pyrenean Mastiff, a large breed of dog originally from the Aragonese Pyrenees in Spain
 Pyrenean ibex, a species of wild goat that became extinct in January 2000